Maria Weenix (1697–1774), was an 18th-century painter from the Northern Netherlands.

Biography
According to the RKD she was the daughter of Jan Weenix, who taught her to paint.
She is known in the literature as "Juffrouw Weeniks" and was admired in her own time for flower still lifes. She accompanied her father to the court of Johann Wilhelm, Elector Palatine where she came into contact with the works of the flower painters Rachel Ruysch, Adriana Spilberg, and Jacoba Maria van Nickelen.
She died in Amsterdam.

References

Literature
 Anke A. Van Wagenberg-Ter Hoeven (2018) Jan Baptist Weenix & Jan Weenix: The Paintings, Zwolle: Waanders & De Kunst.

External links

 Maria Weenix on Artnet

1697 births
1774 deaths
18th-century Dutch painters
Painters from Amsterdam
Dutch women painters
18th-century Dutch women artists